Westgate High School is a high school in unincorporated Iberia Parish, Louisiana, near New Iberia. It is a part of the Iberia Parish School System. It is located at 2305 Jefferson Island Rd. New Iberia, LA 70560

Athletics
Westgate High athletics competes in the LHSAA.

Championships
Football Championships
(1) State Championship: 2021

References

External links
Westgate High School
Westgate High School at Schooldesk

Public high schools in Louisiana
Schools in Iberia Parish, Louisiana